Class 50 may refer to:

British Rail Class 50
DRB Class 50, a German steam locomotive built for the Deutsche Reichsbahn